The Algerian Footballer of the Year is an annual football award for the best Algerian  player presented by El Heddaf-Le Buteur since 2001. The first winner of the award was Olympique de Marseille midfielder Djamel Belmadi. As of 2015, only Karim Ziani, Madjid Bougherra and Riyad Mahrez have won the award on two consecutive occasions . Of the five, only Karim Ziani won his awards playing for two different teams.

Saw the award call many of the stars of world football to deliver the prize to the winner they are Paolo Maldini, Franck Ribéry, Fabio Cannavaro, Emilio Butragueño, Johan Cruyff, Laurent Blanc, Harald Schumacher and Roberto Carlos.

Players of the year (2001–present)

Winners

Winners by country

Winners by club

References

External links 
 Official website of El-Heddaf Magazine

 
Awards established in 2001
2001 establishments in Algeria
Annual events in Algeria
Association football player non-biographical articles